Wanstead and Woodford was a local government district from 1934 to 1965 in southwest Essex, England. A merger of two former urban districts, it was suburban to London and part of the Metropolitan Police District.

Background
A local board of health was set up for the parish of Wanstead in 1854. The Local Government Act 1894 reconstituted its area as Wanstead Urban District, governed by Wanstead Urban District Council.

Woodford parish adopted the Local Government Act 1858 in 1873, setting up a local board. In 1894 it became Woodford Urban District, governed by Woodford Urban District Council.

In 1934, as part of a county review order, a new urban district was created as a merger of their areas.

District and borough
The urban district became a municipal borough in 1937.

In 1956 the municipal borough was enlarged by gaining  from the Municipal Borough of Ilford while  were transferred the other way.

Abolition
In 1965, under the London Government Act 1963, the municipal borough was abolished and its former area transferred to Greater London and combined with that of other districts to form the London Borough of Redbridge.

Meeting place
The old rectory at St Mary's Woodford was converted into a meeting place for the council in 1937 and became known as Wanstead and Woodford Town Hall. After being used as a magistrates court from 1968 to 1988, the building was demolished and the site redeveloped for residential use.

References

External links
A Vision of Britain - Wanstead and Woodford

Districts abolished by the London Government Act 1963
History of the London Borough of Redbridge
History of local government in London (1889–1965)
Municipal boroughs of England